The restored version of Om-Dar-Ba-Dar was released on 17 January 2014.

Filmography

Directing
Kamal Swaroop is an Indian screenwriter and director of film, television and radio. He is best known for his roles on Om-Dar-Ba-Dar (1988) and Rangbhoomi, for which he has received several awards.

Early life
Swaroop was born in Kashmir. His father was a teacher and palmist; his mother was a homemaker. The family moved to Ajmer in the Rajasthan state, where he studied Biology, before moving to Pune in the Maharashtra state, where he studied film directing. He had a brief stint at the Indian Space Research Organisation, where he used Russian fairytales to teach science to children. Following this, he attended filmmaking classes in the remote village of Maharashtra.

In 1974, Swaroop graduated from the Film and Television Institute of India; his student work met with unusual international acclaim. He continued with postgraduate studies at the Institute.

Swaroop assisted the director Richard Attenborough in the filming of Gandhi (1982).

Career

Rangbhoomi

On a grant from the India Foundation for the Arts, IFA, Swaroop began tracing the life of Dadasaheb Phalke through workshops all over India. One such workshop in Benaras was the foundation for his documentary film Rangbhoomi, re-telling the story of Phalke's life there.

Rangbhoomi premiered at the Rome Film Festival in the official competition section. It later won the National Award (Golden Lotus) for best non-feature film, becoming the second national award for Swaroop to win.

Om Dar Ba Dar
The idea of Om Dar-Ba-Dar came to Swaroop on the sets of Gandhi. Commenting, he said, "I managed the crowds and told stories to keep them entertained. One of them was about a boy who skips school and runs away from home when the results are due. He then discovers that he can make a living by holding his breath for a really long time, just like the frogs".

Om Dar-Ba-Dar is set in a mythical small town in Rajasthan and tells the tale of the boy Om growing into adolescence. Son of a fortune teller, Om's major problem is that, riddled with guilt about his voyeurism, he believes himself to be responsible for everything that happens around him. Meanwhile, his elder sister Gayatri, who is being courted by Jagdish, dreams of a future in which she can ride a bicycle or sit in the men's section of a movie theatre.

Many of Om's fantasies about sexuality and death are graphically realised in remarkable song sequences: the science teacher dissecting a frog expands into a Federico Fellini inspired "Rana Tigrina" number or the moonwalk on a terrace on the night that Neil Armstrong landed on the moon. This double-edged satire acquires a further dimension with the entry of Phoolkumari, whose sexuality sends out beguiling yet horrifying message. The war is declared as Diwali firecrackers become real explosions. His father's diamonds, hoarded for black market reasons, are swallowed by frogs. In the end, Om atones by enacting the traditional legend of Brahma's descent to earth.

Made in 1988 with the help of National Film Development Corporation of India, Om Dar-Ba-Dar made it to the festival circuit and then shuffled out into obscurity. This film was a major attraction in the festival circuit and premiered at the Berlin Film Festival but never got a theatrical release in the country.
 Pushkar Puran (2017)
 Battle For Benaras (2014)
 Rangbhoomi (2013)
 Bandish (2007)
 When the Image Meets the Shadow (2004)
 Om-Dar-B-Dar (1988)
 Ghashiram Kotwal (1976)
 Dorothy (1974)

Writing
 Tracing Phalke (2013) 
 Private Detective: Two Plus Two Plus One (1997) (dialogs)
 Salim Langde Pe Mat Ro (1989) (researcher) (script consultant)
 Salaam Bombay (dialogs)

As production designor
 Siddeshwari (1989)

As assistant director
 Gandhi (1982) (assistant director)

References

Living people
Film directors from Jammu and Kashmir
Indian male screenwriters
Place of birth missing (living people)
Year of birth missing (living people)